Portakar or navel stones are traditional ritual stones in Armenia. They are bound up with cult of the fertility goddess, called in ancient Armenia, like the cult of the goddess Anahit.

History 
According to Armenian mythology, women who wished to become pregnant must lean their stomach against the stone. Candle lighting was part of the cult. If a woman became pregnant she should come back and make a mark at the stone.

References

Stones